Straphangin' is an album by the American jazz fusion group, the Brecker Brothers. It was released by Arista Records in 1981.

Reception
AllMusic awarded the album with 3 stars and its review by Rob Theakston states: "No doubt taking sonic cues from Spyro Gyra and Steely Dan, the guys open the album with the mellow title track and the equally suggestive "Threesome" before stepping things up with the highly percussive "Bathsheba".<ref name="Allmusic">Theakston, R. [ Allmusic Review: ''Straphangin] accessed 27 June 2015</ref>

Track listing
 "Straphangin'" (Michael Brecker) - 8:06
 "Threesome" (Randy Brecker) - 6:24
 "Bathsheba" (Michael Brecker) - 6:58
 "Jacknife" (Randy Brecker) - 6:16
 "Why Can’t I Be There" (Randy Brecker) - 5:00
 "Not Ethiopia" (Michael Brecker) - 5:40
 "Spreadeagle" (Randy Brecker) - 5:57

 Personnel The Brecker Brothers Michael Brecker – tenor saxophone, arrangements (1, 3, 6), producer
 Randy Brecker – trumpet, flugelhorn, arrangements (2, 4, 5, 7), producerOther Musicians and Production Credits'''
 Mark Gray – keyboards
 Barry Finnerty – guitars
 Marcus Miller – bass
 Richie Morales – drums
 Manolo Badrena – percussion (1, 3, 4, 5, 7)
 Sammy Figueroa – percussion (1, 3, 4, 5, 7)
 Don Alias – percussion (6)
 Frank Filipetti – recording, mixing, mastering 
 Julian Shapiro – engineer 
 Ted Jensen – mastering 
 Sterling Sound (New York, NY) – mastering location 
 Annie Pfeiffer – production coordinator 
 Neal Pozner – art direction 
 John Ford – photography

References

1981 albums
Brecker Brothers albums
Arista Records albums